EBL may refer to:

Finance
 Eastern Bank Ltd (Bangladesh), a private commercial bank in Dhaka, Bangladesh
 Eastern Bank Ltd (historic), a British bank founded in 1909
 Enterprise Bank Limited, a commercial bank in Nigeria
 Equity Group Holdings Limited, a financial services holding company in the African Great Lakes region

Science and technology
 Electronic back light, a lighting technique for displays and instrument gauges
 Electron-beam lithography
 Electronic brakeforce limitation
 Explanation-based learning, a form of machine learning
 Extragalactic background light, all the accumulated radiation in the universe

Sports
 Elite Basketball League, a semi-professional men's basketball league in the U.S.
 English Basketball League, for professional, semi-professional, and amateur clubs from England and Wales

Other
 Enquiry-based learning
 Erbil International Airport, in Iraq
 Eswatini Beverages Ltd
 European Bridge League, with headquarters in Lausanne, Switzerland
 Evidence-based legislation
 Evidence-based librarianship